Uplands Ski Centre is a small ski area located in Thornhill, Ontario, just north of Toronto, Ontario and operated by the Uplands Golf Club. It has one ski lift—a quad chair starting in the 2012-2013 season. It has four runs averaging 300 m in length and has about 100 feet of vertical (1 blue, 1 black diamond and a 2 greens) Uplands is open from 9:00 a.m. (Friday-Sunday) or noon (Monday-Thursday) until 6:00 p.m. (Weekends) or 9:00 p.m. (Weekdays).

The hill is part of the valley formation along the East Don River and one of two ski areas along the Don River (see North York Ski Centre).

See also
 North York Ski Centre
 Centennial Park
 Beaver Valley Ski Club
 List of ski areas and resorts in Canada